Archbishop Alphonsus Liguori Penney (17 September 1924 – 12 December 2017) was a Canadian Catholic priest who was Archbishop of St. John's from 1979 to 1991. He was born in St. John's, Newfoundland.

Sexual abuse scandal

The Winter Commission was appointed in 1989 by Archbishop Penney and released its report during the following year. Its final report, submitted in 1990, was entitled The report of the Archdiocesan Commission of Enquiry into the Sexual Abuse of Children by Members of the Clergy.

Archbishop Penney resigned on February 2, 1991, following the release of the commission's report, which placed some of the blame for cover-ups of the abuse on him.

References

1924 births
2017 deaths
20th-century Roman Catholic archbishops in Canada
Roman Catholic archbishops of St. John's, Newfoundland
Roman Catholic bishops of Grand Falls